Salem Presbyterian Church is a Presbyterian church at 147 Washington College Road at the Washington College Academy in Tennessee. It was started in 1894 and was added to the National Register of Historic Places in 1992.

History
Salem Presbyterian Church is a historic church in Washington College, Limestone, Tennessee, affiliated with the Holston Presbytery and Presbyterian Church (USA).

The congregation was formed in 1780 under the leadership of Reverend Samuel Doak. It was the first Presbyterian church established in the area that was later to become the state of Tennessee.  The congregation served the adjacent Washington College for many years before becoming a separate congregation.

Construction of the church's current building began in 1894. Its sanctuary has several large stained glass windows.  It was designed by architect A. Page Brown.

The building was listed on the National Register of Historic Places in 1992.  It was also included as a contributing property in the Washington College Historic District, which was listed in 2002.

References

External links
 Salem Presbyterian Church

Presbyterian churches in Tennessee
Churches on the National Register of Historic Places in Tennessee
Romanesque Revival church buildings in Tennessee
Churches completed in 1894
Churches in Washington County, Tennessee
National Register of Historic Places in Washington County, Tennessee